Primož is a male given name, the South Slavic (primarily Slovenian) form of the Latin "Primus",  meaning "first" or "best". Sequential birth-order numerical names were a Roman custom; a male firstborn might be named Primus, a third-born tertia Tertius, a fifth-born son Quintus, etc. The name Primož has Slavified equivalents in Prvan, Prvin and Prvoslav.

Slovene variants 
Primo and Primoš, both being archaic or obsolete variants.

List of people named Primož 
 Primož Benko, Slovene guitarist
 Primož Brezec, Slovene basketballer
 Primož Jakopin, Slovene computer scientist
 Primož Kozmus, Slovene athlete and Olympian
 Primož Kuret, Slovene musicologist
 Primož Lorenz, Slovene pianist
 Primož Parovel, Slovene harmonica player
 Primož Peterka, Slovene ski jumper
 Primož Ramovš, Slovene composer and librarian
 Primož Roglič, a Slovenian racing cyclist 
 Primož Trubar, Slovene Protestant reformer and priest
 Primož Ulaga, Yugoslavian/Slovenian former ski jumper
 Primož Urh-Zupan, Slovene ski jumper

References
 Leksikon imen (Lexicon of Names) by Janez Keber 

Slovene masculine given names